Peter Carleton (September 19, 1755 – April 29, 1828) was an American politician, a farmer, and a United States representative from New Hampshire.

Early life
Born in Haverhill in the Province of Massachusetts Bay, Carleton attended the public schools and engaged in agricultural pursuits. During the American Revolutionary War, he enlisted in January 1777 in Massachusetts, and served under Capt. John Blanchard and Col. James Wesson. He held the rank of Sergeant Major and served until December 31, 1779, when he was discharged at West Point, New York. During his service, he was in the battles of Bemis Heights and Stillwater.

Career
Carleton moved to Landaff, Grafton County, New Hampshire,  about 1789. He was a member of the New Hampshire constitutional convention in 1790. In 1803 the Coos Bank of Haverhill was chartered. One of the incorporators, he was also a director of the bank.
A member of the New Hampshire House of Representatives in 1803 and 1804, he then served in the New Hampshire Senate in 1806 and 1807.

Elected as a Democratic-Republican to the Tenth Congress, Carleton served as United States Representative for New Hampshire from (March 4, 1807 – March 3, 1809).

Death
Carleton  died in Landaff, New Hampshire on April 29, 1828 (age 72 years, 223 days); and is interred at Landaff Center Cemetery, Landaff, Grafton County, New Hampshire.

Family life
Son of Peter and Hanna Gage, Carleton married Abigail Haseltine on January 6, 1782, and they had seven children, Prisilla, Frederick, Edward, Zalinda, George, John, and Louise. He married Azubah Taylor on March 8, 1801, in Bath, Grafton County, New Hampshire; and they had five children, George, Mary, James, Hannah, and Carleton. He applied for a pension on April 9, 1818, for his service during the Revolutionary war and the pension was allowed.

Slave ownership
According to research conducted by The Washington Post, Carleton owned a young female slave named Gin and had her baptised in 1764.

References

External links

 

1755 births
1828 deaths
Politicians from Haverhill, Massachusetts
People of colonial Massachusetts
American people of English descent
Democratic-Republican Party members of the United States House of Representatives from New Hampshire
People from Landaff, New Hampshire
Continental Army soldiers
American slave owners